The Italy national badminton team represents Italy in international badminton team competitions and is controlled by the Italian Badminton Federation (Italian: Federazione Italiana Badminton). The Italian national team competed in the Sudirman Cup but have never once qualified for the Thomas Cup and the Uber Cup.

The national team competed in the European Men's and Women's Team Badminton Championships and the European Mixed Team Badminton Championships but have never got pass the group stage. The Italian team also competed in the Mediterranean Games and has won a few medals in badminton at the Games.

Participation in BWF competitions

Sudirman Cup

Participation in European Team Badminton Championships

Men's Team

Women's Team

Mixed Team

Participation in Helvetia Cup

Participation in European Junior Team Badminton Championships
Mixed Team

Current squad 

Male players
Kevin Strobl
Giovanni Greco
Fabio Caponio
Gianmarco Bailetti
David Salutt
Enrico Baroni
Giovanni Toti

Female players
Katharina Fink
Yasmine Hamza
Judith Mair
Lisa Sagmeister
Silvia Garino
Lisa Iversen

References

Badminton
National badminton teams
Badminton in Italy